Pike County is a county in the U.S. state of Illinois. It is located between the Mississippi River and the Illinois River in western Illinois. According to the 2010 United States Census, it had a population of 16,430. Its county seat is Pittsfield.

History
Pike County was formed in January 1821 out of Madison County. It was named in honor of Zebulon Pike, leader of the Pike Expedition in 1806 to map out the south and west portions of the Louisiana Purchase. Pike served at the Battle of Tippecanoe, and was killed in 1813 in the War of 1812.

Prior to the coming of the first European settler to the future Pike County, French traders, hunters, and travelers passed through the native forests and prairies. Originally Pike County began on the south junction of the Illinois and Mississippi rivers. The east boundary was the Illinois River north to the Kankakee River to the Indiana State line on north to Wisconsin territorial line and then west to the Mississippi River to the original point at the south end. The first county seat was Cole's Grove, a post town, in what later became Calhoun County. The Gazetteer of Illinois and Missouri, published in 1822, mentioned Chicago as "a village of Pike County" containing 12 or 15 houses and about 60 or 70 inhabitants.

The New Philadelphia Town Site was listed on the National Register of Historic Places in 2005, designated a National Historic Landmark in 2009, and established as a National Park in 2022.  Founded by Frank McWorter, an early free black settler in Pike County, it was the first town founded by a black man in the United States.  McWorter had invested in land there sight unseen after purchasing the first few members of his family out of slavery.  In 1836 he founded the town of New Philadelphia, near Barry. He was elected mayor and lived there the rest of his life. With the sale of land, he made enough money to purchase the freedom of his children. After the railroad bypassed the town, its growth slowed and it was eventually abandoned in the 20th century. The town site is now an archaeological site.

In the early 21st century, Pike County acquired notability as a whitetail deer hunting center, especially for bowhunting.

Geography

Pike County is located on the highlands between the Illinois River, which forms its eastern border, and the Mississippi River, which borders Missouri. It has two interstate highways, I-72, with bridges spanning both rivers to enter the county, and I-172 which extends about  into the county to its intersection with I-72.

Climate and weather

Major highways

  Interstate 72
  Interstate 172
  U.S. Route 36
  U.S. Route 54
  Illinois Route 57
  Illinois Route 96
  Illinois Route 106
  Illinois Route 107
  Illinois Route 100

Adjacent counties

 Adams County - north
 Brown County - northeast
 Scott County - east
 Morgan County - east
 Greene County - southeast
 Calhoun County - south
 Pike County, Missouri - southwest
 Ralls County, Missouri - west
 Marion County, Missouri - northwest

Pike County is one of the few US counties to border as many as nine counties. Illinois has two – Pike and LaSalle.

National protected area
 Great River National Wildlife Refuge (part)

Demographics

As of the 2010 United States Census, there were 16,430 people, 6,639 households, and 4,527 families residing in the county. The racial makeup of the county was 96.9% white, 1.7% black or African American, 0.2% Asian, 0.2% American Indian, 0.2% from other races, and 0.7% from two or more races. Those of Hispanic or Latino origin made up 1.0% of the population. In terms of ancestry, 26.3% were German, 16.8% were American, 15.1% were English, and 13.4% were Irish.

Of the 6,639 households, 30.3% had children under the age of 18 living with them, 54.5% were married couples living together, 9.0% had a female householder with no husband present, 31.8% were non-families, and 27.8% of all households were made up of individuals. The average household size was 2.38 and the average family size was 2.87. The median age was 42.5 years.

The median income for a household in the county was $40,205 and the median income for a family was $50,426. Males had a median income of $39,071 versus $26,835 for females. The per capita income for the county was $19,996. About 11.3% of families and 15.4% of the population were below the poverty line, including 23.7% of those under age 18 and 11.2% of those age 65 or over.

Politics
Pike County was reliably Democratic from 1892 through 1948; only 2 Republican Party nominees carried the county vote during that period. However, it was a national bellwether in every presidential election from 1912 to 2004 aside from 1924 & 1988. Since 2000, the county has become a Republican stronghold, with Donald Trump winning it in the 2016 presidential election by a margin of 57.6 points. The county is located in Illinois's 18th Congressional District and is currently represented by Republican Davin LaHood. For the Illinois House of Representatives, the county is located in the 100th district and is currently represented by Republican C.D. Davidsmeyer. The county is located in the 50th district of the Illinois Senate, and is currently represented by Republican William McCann.

Communities

Cities
 Barry
 Griggsville
 Pittsfield (seat)

Villages

 Baylis
 Detroit
 El Dara
 Florence
 Hull
 Kinderhook
 Milton
 Nebo
 New Salem
 Pearl
 Perry
 Pleasant Hill
 Time
 Valley City

Town
 New Canton

Census Designated Place
 Rockport

Unincorporated communities

 Atlas
 Bedford
 Chambersburg
 East Hannibal
 Fishhook
 Maysville
 Munger
 New Hartford
 Pike Station
 Seehorn
 Straut
 Summer Hill

Ghost towns

 Dutton
 Griggsville Landing
 New Philadelphia

Townships

 Atlas Township
 Barry Township
 Chambersburg Township
 Cincinnati Township
 Derry Township
 Detroit Township
 Fairmount Township
 Flint Township
 Griggsville Township
 Hadley Township
 Hardin Township
 Kinderhook Township
 Levee Township
 Martinsburg Township
 Montezuma Township
 Newburg Township
 New Salem Township
 Pearl Township
 Perry Township
 Pittsfield Township
 Pleasant Hill Township
 Pleasant Vale Township
 Ross Township
 Spring Creek Township

See also
 National Register of Historic Places listings in Pike County, Illinois

References

External links
 Pike County Chamber of Commerce
 Pike County books and primary sources
 New Philadelphia Association
 Free Frank New Philadelphia Historic Preservation Foundation
 Christopher C. Fennell, "Updates on New Philadelphia Archaeology Project", University of Illinois, Urbana-Champaign
 New Philadelphia: A Multiracial Town on the Illinois Frontier, a National Park Service Teaching with Historic Places (TwHP) lesson plan
 Pike County Township Histories summation
 Pike County Illinois History

 
1821 establishments in Illinois
Populated places established in 1821
Illinois counties
Illinois counties on the Mississippi River